Bellucia is a genus of plants in the family Melastomataceae.

Species
Species as of 2020 from Catalogue of Life:
 Bellucia acutata Pilg.
 Bellucia aequiloba Pilg.
 Bellucia arborescens (Aubl.) Baill.
 Bellucia beckii S.S.Renner
 Bellucia dichotoma Cogn.
 Bellucia egensis (DC.) Penneys, Michelang., Judd & Almeda
 Bellucia gracilis (S.S.Renner) Penneys, Michelang., Judd & Almeda
 Bellucia grossularioides (L.) Triana
 Bellucia huberi (Wurdack) S.S.Renner
 Bellucia klugii (S.S.Renner) Penneys, Michelang., Judd & Almeda
 Bellucia mespiloides (Miq.) Macbr.
 Bellucia nigricans (Hook.fil.) Penneys, Michelang., Judd & Almeda
 Bellucia ovata (O.Berg ex Triana) Penneys, Michelang., Judd & Almeda
 Bellucia pentamera Naud.
 Bellucia riparia (S.S.Renner) Penneys, Michelang., Judd & Almeda
 Bellucia spruceana (Benth. ex Triana) Macbr.
 Bellucia strigosa (Gleason) Penneys, Michelang., Judd & Almeda
 Bellucia subandina (Wurdack) Penneys, Michelang., Judd & Almeda
 Bellucia subrotundifolia Wurdack
 Bellucia umbellata Gleason
 Bellucia villosa G.Lozano-Contreras & L.M.Quiñones
 Bellucia wurdackiana (S.S.Renner) Penneys, Michelang., Judd & Almeda

References

External links
 
 

 
Melastomataceae genera
Taxa named by Noël Martin Joseph de Necker